Behram Daku is a 1980 Pakistani Punjabi language action film, directed by Rauf Abbasi and produced by Khawaja Feroz Din. Film starring actor Sultan Rahi in the lead role, with Aasia and Allauddin, Talish.

Cast
 Sultan Rahi – Behram Daku
 Aasia – Taji
 Chakori – Nohu Pati
 Adeeb – Habith Khan
 Talish – Karnal Laras
 Allauddin – Maulvi Saab
 Sawan – Jagat Nath
 M. Ajmal – Father of Behram Daku
 Khayyam – Veena Nath
 Nasrullah Butt – Jagat Nath's son
 Jagi Malik – Dullah Bamb Daciket
 Changezi
 Khalid Saleem Mota – Akbra
 Ilyas Kashmiri – Sher Singh 
 Rehan – Officer
 Anwar Majeed – Ram Lal
 Nimmo
 Taya Barkat – Fazlu Chacha
 Aboo Shah
 Nanha
 Ibrar
 Saleem Hassan
 Sahil Siddiqi
 Haider Abbas
 Zaman

Track list
Film music is by Salim Iqbal and film song lyrics by Waris Ludhianvi and Sahil Siddiqi

References

External links
 

Films set in the British Raj
Pakistani action films
Punjabi-language Pakistani films
1980 films
1980 directorial debut films